Ampatigri village is located in Betasing Tehsil of South West Garo Hills district in Meghalaya in India.

References

Villages in South West Garo Hills district